Percy Dyhrberg (10 February 1918 – 30 March 1990) was a New Zealand cricketer. He played in one first-class match for Central Districts in 1951/52.

See also
 List of Central Districts representative cricketers

References

External links
 

1918 births
1990 deaths
New Zealand cricketers
Central Districts cricketers
Cricketers from Wellington City